Ho Peng Yoke 何丙郁, born 4 April 1926 in Kinta Valley, died 18 October 2014 in Brisbane, was a Malaya-born historian of Chinese science, whose work in Australia, the UK, and Hong Kong contributed greatly to its understanding in Anglophone academia. After a distinguished career at Griffith University, where he was Chairman (1973–78) and Foundation Professor of the School of Modern Asian Studies, he became the director of the Needham Research Institute from 1990-2001. He was a Fellow of the Australian Academy of the Humanities and an Academician of Academia Sinica.

Selected Bibliography 
 The Astronomical Chapters of the Jin Shu, Mouton & Co, 1966.
 with F. P. Lisowski,  Concepts of Chinese Science and Traditional Healing Arts: A Historical Overview, World Scientific, 1993, 100 pages 
 with F. P. Lisowski, A Brief History of Chinese Medicine and Its Influence, World Scientific, 1999, 124 pages 
 Li, Qi and Shu: An Introduction to Science and Civilization in China, Dover Publications, 2000, 272 pages 
 Chinese Mathematical Astrology: Reaching out for the stars, RoutledgeCurzon, 2003, 232 pages 
 Reminiscence of a Roving Scholar, (autobiographie), World Scientific,2005, 252 pages 
11 articles in Encyclopaedia of the History of Science, Technology, and Medicine in Non-Western Cultures.

References

Chinese historians
1926 births
2014 deaths
Australian sinologists